Stictane chinesica is a moth in the family Erebidae. It was described by Max Wilhelm Karl Draudt in 1931. It is found in China.

References

Moths described in 1931
Nudariina